Arturo Núñez Jiménez (born 23 January 1948) is a Mexican politician affiliated with the PRD (formerly to the PRI) who served as Governor of Tabasco from 2013 to 2018.

In January 1993 he was appointed to the Direction of the Federal Electoral Institute, where he was in charge of the elections of that year.

He also served as Deputy during the LVII Legislature of the Mexican Congress representing Tabasco, where he was Coordinator of the PRI Legislative Group, and between 1998 and 1999 he was the President of the Chamber of Deputies.

In 2005 he resigned his affiliation to the PRI and announced his candidature to the Senate now with the PRD. In September 2006 he took office as Senator of the LX and part of the LXI Legislatures of the Mexican Congress.

In December 2011 he won the nomination to the Governature of Tabasco by the Progresist Movement Coalition, integrated by the PRD, the Convergence and the Labor Party and subsequently winning the election on 1 July 2012, being the first non-PRI Governor of Tabasco in 83 years.

References

External links
 Official website

1948 births
Living people
People from Villahermosa
Members of the Senate of the Republic (Mexico)
Members of the Chamber of Deputies (Mexico)
Presidents of the Chamber of Deputies (Mexico)
Governors of Tabasco
Institutional Revolutionary Party politicians
Party of the Democratic Revolution politicians
21st-century Mexican politicians
Politicians from Tabasco
National Autonomous University of Mexico alumni
20th-century Mexican politicians